is a Japanese manga series based on the Pokémon media franchise created by video game designer Satoshi Tajiri and managed by The Pokémon Company. Tajiri once stated that the series is closest to how he imagined the universe of Pokémon to be.

The series is written by Hidenori Kusaka. Mato was the illustrator for the first nine volumes. When Mato became ill and was unable to continue illustrating the series, Satoshi Yamamoto took over as the illustrator and still continues as the series' artist.

Pokémon Adventures is translated into English in North America by Viz Media. As of January 2023, 59 volumes have been released, along with five pairs of mini-volumes depicting the "Black & White", "X & Y", "OmegaRuby & AlphaSapphire", "Sun & Moon", and "Sword & Shield" arc. In Southeast Asia, Singapore publisher Chuang Yi was translating Pokémon Adventures into English, and continued to translate new volumes up to volume 41. The company, however, entered voluntary liquidation in early 2014 and translation stopped. Shogakukan Asia now handles the series in Singapore.

Plot

Pokémon Adventures is divided into several distinct parts which are known as chapters, and those, in turn, are divided further into volumes and many smaller chapters. There are fifteen major divisions at present, with twelve of them completely published, and one of them partially published. 64 volumes of the manga have been released as of February 2023.

Due to the serialization of Black 2 & White 2 chapter on hold and taking many years before being collected into a volume, the X & Y and subsequent chapters of Pokémon Adventures were separately collected into mini-volumes. The rounds included in these mini-volumes were only ones that were published in the CoroCoro Ichiban magazine. Once the Black 2 & White 2 chapter ended in the regular volumes, the subsequent chapters started to be collected in that format as well.

Red, Green & Blue

The first story shows Red, the protagonist, who gets his Pokédex from Professor Oak to start on his Pokémon journey, collecting Pokémon and battling gym leaders for the eight coveted gym badges. He later meets his rival Blue  who is Oak's own grandson. Later in his journey, he encounters con artist Green , who sells him fake Pokémon items. She has stolen a Squirtle from Oak’s lab and has evolved it into a Wartortle.

Later, Oak had been kidnapped by Team Rocket to create a Mewtwo, and Red, Green and Blue arrive at Saffron City to take on the Team Rocket Admins—Koga, Lt. Surge, and Sabrina. They manage to defeat Team Rocket and save Oak. It is revealed that using 7 gym badges, Arcticuno, Zapdos, and Moltres will be fused after Green does, unaware of the results. Their fusion results in a Pokemon referred to Zapmolcuno, which looks like the three Legendary Birds fused together at the body, having all three of their heads. Red, Green, and Blue then work together to defeat and split the bird apart. Red then travels to the Indigo Plateau to battle his rival Blue, having gained seven badges, but also prevails against the evil bio-weapon Mewtwo and Team Rocket's leader and legendary missing Viridian Gym Leader, Giovanni, on the way. Green is confronted by Oak about stealing and is forgiven. Red later battles Blue in the Pokémon League Championships and emerges victorious, claiming the title of champion of the Pokémon League.

Yellow
Red has disappeared after receiving a challenge letter sent to him by Bruno of the Elite Four. They plan to lure him to them, and use him to get information on Giovanni’s whereabouts. They also need his Earth Badge. Only Red’s Pikachu, Pika, managed to escape, Red having been encased in ice. Yellow decided to go look for Red, as Red had helped her catch a Rattata  to train her in the skills of battling.

Later, Yellow, Blaine, Blue, Green, Bill, Lt. Surge, Koga and Sabrina join forces to bring down the Elite Four together. They find out that Lance’s master plan was to use the Gym Badges and create an amplifying effect at Cerise Island to power up a mysterious Legendary Pokémon and destroy all humans in the world except themselves. They felt that humans and Pokémon were not meant to coexist. Red turned up later at Cerise Island to help Surge and Bill defeat Bruno. It is also revealed that Giovanni was the one who rescued Red from his ice coffin. Yellow battles Lance, but is losing until the other trainers send their power to Yellow, and with their combined strength, she manages to defeat Lance.

Gold, Silver & Crystal

The third adventure is based on the Pokémon Gold, Silver, and Crystal versions of the game.  It features the protagonists Gold, Silver and Crystal, and is centered mostly around the Johto region, with Gold as the point of view character. Gold first started his journey to chase a thief that broke into Professor Elm's lab, and stole a Totodile. Gold then made it his mission to get Totodile back from Silver (who stole it), and follows Silver. In Gold's quest to steal back Totodile, he decided to become fully involved in Silver's life. But following him gets him wrapped up in Neo Team Rocket (a revival of Team Rocket), and Gold tries to stop them. In a shocking reveal, it turns out one of the gym leaders is the Neo Team Rocket's leader, the Ice type gym leader, Pryce. He was also the Mask of Ice, a mysterious man who kidnapped Silver and Green as children. The Johto Trio (Gold, Silver, and a pro catcher named Crystal) then stop both Neo Rocket and the Mask of Ice in a dramatic final battle to end off the chapter.

Ruby & Sapphire
The Ruby & Sapphire manga is based on the Ruby and Sapphire  versions of the game. It features Ruby and Sapphire  and their bet to each other: 80 days for Ruby to win all the Contest Ribbons in Hoenn, and for Sapphire, a powerful trainer in her own right, to battle all the Gym Leaders for the 8 badges.

In their travels, they meet new companions like the gym leaders of the Hoenn region and the avid news reporter Gabby and her cameraman Ty (who play a minor role in the games). Team Aqua and Team Magma are introduced here, as they attempt to awaken the legendary Pokémon Kyogre and Groudon to conquer the world, and Ruby and Sapphire take notice after encountering several main members in their journeys. The gym leaders, Ruby, and Sapphire end up trying to protect Hoenn from the awakened Kyogre and Groudon, their awakening causes a disaster as Ruby loses a contest, leading to his Feebas running away and unable to find its way back. Ruby, however, finds it and apologizes, and gives it the Hyper Rank Beauty Ribbon, after which it evolves into Milotic. In the chapter Rayquaza Redemption II, Sapphire confesses that she has developed feelings for Ruby.

FireRed & LeafGreen
The next story, returning to Red, Green, and Blue, is loosely based on the Sevii Islands portion of the FireRed and LeafGreen versions of the game. The plot consists of Team Rocket trying to capture Deoxys, and Red, Green, and Blues’ efforts to stop them. Along the way, they must rescue Green's parents and Professor Oak, who is Blue's grandfather, who have been kidnapped by Deoxys. Despite their best efforts, they are not able to stop Team Rocket from obtaining Deoxys, even though they’ve mastered the ultimate attacks taught by Ultima, an old but powerful woman residing on Two Island. After being defeated, Red is approached by Mewtwo who offers help in defeating Team Rocket.

Yellow and Silver are reintroduced as they later search for clues about Silver’s parents. Knowing that his objective was somewhere in Viridian City, Silver met up with Yellow in the forest. Meanwhile, Giovanni used Deoxys's power to search for his lost son and was led to the Viridian Forest too. It is revealed that Silver is Giovanni's son and he passes out in shock. Yellow follows Team Rocket, who brought Silver back with them to an airship.

Red and Mewtwo challenge Giovanni. He loses, but the airship flies out of control. It is revealed that Red and Deoxys’ have a connection because it absorbed some of Red’s blood. Together, Red, Blue, Green, Yellow and Silver stop Deoxys from destroying the area but they are caught in an energy clash that petrifies them. Though Mewtwo is also caught in the attack, his body is nowhere to be seen. Deoxys manages to escape moments before the blast and is currently searching for the other Deoxys that was disposed of after Team Rocket had no further use for it.

Emerald
The protagonist of this story arc is Emerald, who is hired by Crystal and Professor Oak to capture Jirachi in seven days before it is captured by Guile Hideout, the main antagonist. Emerald is also trying to challenge the seven facilities of the Battle Frontier and conquer them all. In the process, Emerald meets with the other two Hoenn Pokédex holders, Ruby and Sapphire.

The three Pokédex owners take on the Battle Frontier challenge, but they are interrupted by Guile Hideout, who was manipulating the head of the Battle Tower, Anabel. In an ensuing battle with Emerald, he releases Anabel from his control and reveals himself to be Team Aqua's leader, Archie. He also reveals that he has caught Jirachi, and subsequently uses it to summon a massive water-composed clone of Kyogre to flood the Battle Frontier. Archie hints that he is unable to be separated from the armor covering him for a prolonged period of time.

The three Pokédex holders escape the rising waters with the help of Gold and Crystal, who have also arrived at the Battle Frontier. Gold explains that the five Pokédex owners who were petrified — Red, Blue, Green, Yellow and Silver — were ordered to be shipped to the Battle Frontier. The hope was for them to be de-petrified through a wish to Jirachi. While Crystal trains Ruby and Sapphire to learn a powerful skill that can help stop Kyogre, Archie abandons Jirachi, who is subsequently left in Emerald's hands.

Gold assigns Emerald to make a wish to de-petrify Red, Blue, Green, Yellow and Silver. After finally coming into terms with his real desire—to be with Pokémon and people who like them, Jirachi grants his wish, and the five Pokédex owners are cured of their petrification. Red and Gold immediately incapacitate Archie by destroying his armor. With all ten Pokédex owners now reunited, they combine their strongest attacks together and defeat Kyogre and Archie, who vanishes for good.

Diamond & Pearl

This storyline is based on the Diamond and Pearl versions of the game. It features Lady Platinum Berlitz, who, for her coming-of-age ceremony, must travel to the top of Mt. Coronet in order to collect materials to create her own family emblem. Despite her vast knowledge, due to coming from a wealthy family of scholars, her father insists that she is followed by a pair of professional bodyguards. However, an identity mishap occurs as manzai comedians Diamond and Pearl believe that Platinum is their tour guide who will accompany them on a prize trip around Sinnoh, while Platinum believes that the duo are her bodyguards.

As they travel Sinnoh, Platinum becomes engrossed in Gym Battles after fighting Roark in order to up her Piplup’s confidence. She manages to obtain six gym badges within a space of 25 days, which Byron remarks to have beaten Sapphire’s previous record of 8 badges in 80 days. While helping Platinum prepare for Gym Battles through intense periods of training, the starter Pokémon bestowed upon them by Professor Rowan gradually evolve to their final evolved form, while Platinum’s Ponyta evolves into a Rapidash.

In an encounter with Team Galactic while in Veilstone City, Platinum becomes Galactic’s ransom target, as a means to extract capital to develop a bomb, which would be used to destroy the three lakes of Sinnoh. Platinum’s center of attention causes the banishment of her real bodyguards to a different realm, causing Diamond and Pearl to continue faking as professional bodyguards, while now knowing the truth. The evidence is further solidified when the trio visit Celestic Town to find Cyrus studying the ruins there.

After battling Fantina for a gym badge, the trio learn that Platinum’s father and Professor Rowan have been kidnapped while at an academic conference in Canalave City. They immediately speed to Canalave City aboard Fantina’s Drifblim.  After her father and Professor Rowan are saved, Platinum learns that Diamond and Pearl were not her bodyguards; while this causes a rift between them, Platinum reconciles with them by revealing her name as a means of declaring she recognizes the two as her friends.  They resolve to continue their journey through Sinnoh in order to stop Team Galactic's nefarious plans and save the legendary Pokémon (Mesprit, Uxie, and Azelf) of Sinnoh's three lakes. And Diamond, Pearl, and Platinum will be informed that Team Galactic captures the trio legendary Pokémon use them to the production of Red Chain in order to summon to the two legendary Pokémon in charge of time and space, Dialga and Palkia create a new universe.

Platinum
The chapter follows Lady Platinum Berlitz, separate with Diamond and Pearl, as she enters the Battle Frontier; as well as Looker, who is international police investigating information on the Team Galactic and assist Platinum investigating information on the Distortion World, where her original bodyguards, Dialga and Palkia, and Cyrus, the leader of Team Galactic. To this end, Platinum will challenge the Frontier Brains to obtain intelligence.
 
At the same time, Charon of Team Galactic also initiate a plan of action to take possession of the legendary Pokémon of Sinnoh, including the legendary Pokémon expelled to Distortion World, Giratina.

HeartGold & SoulSilver
This arc is based on the Generation IV games, HeartGold and SoulSilver, and takes place between the Emerald and Diamond & Pearl arc. Gold is tasked by Professor Oak to find former villain Lance in the Pokéathlon, as he holds information about the Alpha Pokémon, Arceus. Gold decides to compete in the Pokéathlon and wins the contests, but is unable to find Lance. Meanwhile, Silver discovers that Team Rocket has been resurrected once again, and is using 3 plates, items that greatly boost a Pokémon based on type, for another evil plot. Both events cause Gold, Silver, and Crystal to investigate the situation, eventually taking them to the Sinjoh Ruins, where the 4 executives behind Team Rocket plan to use Arceus, who has lost faith in humanity, to summon Dialga, Palkia, and Giratina to bring back their leader, Giovanni. The trio, helped by Giovanni, a reformed Lance, and Pryce (who has returned from the crack of time), defeat the Legendary Pokémon and restore Arceus' faith in humanity.

Black & White

This arc features a boy named Black and his Tepig "Tep"  on a quest to become a master trainer, along with Black's Braviary "Brav"  and Munna "Musha".  When his ambition to become the best trainer in Unova gets the better of him, he causes a scene by screaming out his dream with his Pokémon. One day due to an encounter with a Galvantula, he destroys a film set and ends up under the employment of a girl named White, the owner of female Tepig Gigi  and happens to be the proud president of the BW Agency, a company that provides Pokémon actors for various productions. Black and White's Tepigs have a crush on each other, and White happens to require the services of Black's Tep. The rivals of the Black and White game, Cheren and Bianca, appear as Pokédex holders, Cheren with a Snivy and Bianca with Oshawott. Due to an accident at Professor Juniper's lab, Black is left with the only functioning Pokédex from Professor Juniper's lab, thus making him especially important for completing the Pokédex; it also makes him a target of Team Plasma due to his opposition towards their ideals of "Pokémon liberation".

Black 2 & White 2
The plot of Pokémon Black 2 and White 2 is a special class trip arc. It follows Blake (Lack-Two in Japan), a member of the International Police who seeks to arrest the seven sages and the other Neo Team Plasma members, and Whitley (Whi-Two in Japan), a former member of Team Plasma yearning for the return of N. They are new students in Cheren's class along with Hugh, who vows himself to defeat Neo Team Plasma and get the Purrloin they stole for his sister back. Neo Team Plasma's plans now are to take over the Unova region and awaken the legendary Pokémon named Kyurem.

The serialization of the story arc began in July 2013. On September 27, 2016, it was announced that the chapter would be published digitally in Shogakukan's "Sunday Web Every". It began on October 4, 2016 and released each chapter of volume 52 on a weekly basis before continuing on to the first round of volume 53 on a monthly basis starting November 22, 2016. Another hiatus occurred following February 2018, but serialization resumed in March 2019 until its completion in April 2020. Its regular volumes publication began in December 2014 and concluded in May 2020.

X & Y
The X & Y chapter focuses on a depressed boy named X, who won a major tournament as a child, and Y, a girl who dreams of becoming a Sky Trainer. X has been forced out of hiding when the two legendary Pokémon blow up his town. Soon, he meets up with a group called Team Flare who tries to steal his tool that enables mega evolution. X, Y, and their companions, Shauna, Tierno, and Trevor have to try to escape Team Flare by seeking a place where they can go in peace; however, the plan doesn't go like X and his friends want.

Serialization of this story arc began in October 2013 and concluded in November 2016. The publication of the X & Y chapter in the regular volumes format began in May 2020 and concluded in February 2022.

Omega Ruby & Alpha Sapphire
The Omega Ruby & Alpha Sapphire arc focuses on the returning Hoenn trio of Ruby, Sapphire, and Emerald based on the Omega Ruby and Alpha Sapphire versions of the game. Ruby, Sapphire, and Emerald acquire Mega Bracelets and Mega Stones from Steven to help aid his quest to save the Earth from impending doom by a meteorite while Ruby encounters a mysterious girl along the way. Sapphire is traumatized when she learns the truth about the meteor, and in result of that trauma she loses her voice and sense of smell. Ruby takes on the role of lorekeeper and gets Rayquaza to trust him so they can save the world through the use of dragon lore. It is based primarily on the events of the Delta Episode in the games.

The arc was released digitally on Shogakukan's "Web Sunday," with a new chapter on the first Tuesday of every month. The first mini-volume was released in Japan on July 24, 2015.

Sun, Moon, Ultra Sun & Ultra Moon
This chapter features a boy named Sun who is a courier with the hope of gathering 100 million Yen and a girl named Moon who is a pharmacist and an archer. In order to calm the wrath of the Tapu, one of which unexpectedly attacked them, the guardian deities of Alola, they embarked on an island challenge journey, and will face Team Skull and Aether Foundation’s Ultra Beast-related conspiracy, the mysterious creatures come from another dimension Ultra Space.

Sword & Shield 
Marvin is a young boy who just moved to Galar region and met Henry Sword (Sōdo Tsurugi in Japan) and Casey Shield (Shieldmilia Tate in Japan), the boy is a "Meister" of repair Pokemon's gear and hopes to have an opportunity to see the legendary artifacts Rusted Sword and Shield, and the girl is a computer engineer who is interested in Dynamax and looking for her lost Pokemon team. They traveled with Professor Magnolia to help her investigate the Dynamax phenomenon. And Henry and Casey are planning to challenge the Galar Pokemon League, in order to gather information about Casey's lost Pokemon.

Characters

The protagonists of this series are mainly the Pokémon trainers who called Pokédex Holders that are recognized by the well-known Pokémon professors in various regions and awarded Pokédex.

As of Sword & Shield chapter, there are 23 Pokédex Holders and according to their region and the version of Pokédex they hold, they can be divided into eight groups.

Kanto
Red – The male protagonist in the Red, Green & Blue and FireRed & LeafGreen chapters and the first protagonist in this series. The champion of the 9th Indigo Plateau Pokémon League. Initially shown as a rash young trainer, he has matured over the course of the series. His first Pokémon was a Poliwag, which is first seen as a Poliwhirl. It later evolves into Poliwrath to save Red from drowning. When he started his journey, he received a Bulbasaur from Professor Oak. It eventually evolved to a Venusaur, but he temporarily traded it with his rival Blue for a Charizard in FireRed and LeafGreen, though they traded back at the end of the saga. His Pokémon are Poliwrath (Poli), Venusaur (Saur), Pikachu (Pika), Snorlax (Snor), Espeon (Vee), Gyarados (Gyara) and Aerodactyl (Aero). He specializes in Pokémon Battles (The Fighter). In his latest appearance in ORAS he is twenty.
Blue - The other male protagonist in the Red, Green & Blue and FireRed & LeafGreen chapters. The cool-headed yet somewhat cocky rival of Red; their relationship has improved over the course of the series. He had the starter Pokémon Charmander, now a Charizard. He excels at training Pokémon (The Trainer), even those that are not his. His team as of the FRLG saga consists of Charizard, Golduck, Machamp, Rhydon, Porygon2, and Scizor. In G/S/C/HG/SS he has been made gym leader of Viridian City after Red declined that offer. Although the exact timing of his appearance in the XY chapter is unknown, it is probable that it occurs simultaneously with the ORAS chapter, making him twenty.
Green - The female protagonist in the Red, Green & Blue and FireRed & LeafGreen chapters. A crafty and perky girl who stole a Squirtle from Professor Oak. It was revealed that when she was young, she was one of the Masked Children along with Johto dex holder, Silver. She made her first appearance by persuading Red into buying fake items by using her beauty. Now, she is one of Red's closest friends. Her Squirtle has since evolved into a Blastoise. She excels at evolving Pokémon (The Evolver). Her current team comprises Blastoise (Blasty), Wigglytuff (Jiggly), Clefable (Clefy), Granbull, Nidoqueen (Nido), and Ditto (Ditty). She used to have Ornithophobia before overcoming it by capturing Articuno, Zapdos, and Moltres. As of her latest appearance in the ORAS chapter, she is twenty.
Yellow - The protagonist in the Yellow chapter. She is happy-go-lucky, gentle, and kind-hearted. Yellow has a rare psychic power to heal Pokémon (The Healer), a trait seen only in special individuals from the Viridian Forest area. She disguised herself as a boy on a mission to save Red. She also has a psychic power to read Pokémons' minds, which is also from the Viridian Forest. She always sleeps after using her abilities due to their high use of her energy. During her adventures, she borrowed Red’s Pikachu. She now has her own Pikachu, a female named Chuchu. Her current team consists of Pikachu (Chuchu), Golem (Gravvy), Omastar (Omny), Dodrio (Dody), Butterfree (Kitty), and Raticate (Ratty).

Johto
Gold - The male protagonist in the Gold, Silver & Crystal and HeartGold & SoulSilver chapters. The good-hearted, but somewhat perverse, protagonist of the Gold & Silver saga. Very rash, even more so than Red. He is capable in hatching Pokémon (The Breeder).  His current team consists of Typhlosion (Exbo), Ambipom (Aibo), Mantine (Tibo), Politoed (Polibo), Sudowoodo (Sudobo), Sunflora (Sunbo), Togekiss (Togebo), and Pichu (Pibu), who was given to him by Yellow as a result of her and Red's Pikachu's courtship. His first adventure started in G/S/C thinking Silver stole his backpack full of Pokémon. In HG/SS he is sixteen. 
Silver - The other male protagonist in the Gold, Silver & Crystal and HeartGold & SoulSilver chapters. Gold’s cold and distant rival, the son of Team Rocket leader Giovanni. Was a Masked Child until rescued by his sister figure Green. He had the starter Pokémon Totodile (stolen, like Green’s Squirtle), now a Feraligatr. He specializes in trading Pokémon (The Exchanger). His team consists of Feraligatr, Weavile, Kingdra, Honchkrow, Rhyperior and the red Gyarados. In HG/SS he is sixteen.
Crystal (Crys/Kris) - The female protagonist in the Gold, Silver & Crystal and HeartGold & SoulSilver chapters. An intelligent and energetic expert at catching Pokémon (The Capturer). She has caught every non-legendary Pokémon for Professor Oak (she got the legendary Pokémon’s data with the help of the 1st generation trainers). She had a Chikorita for a starter Pokémon, which is now a Meganium. She so far owns Meganium (Megaree), Xatu (Xatee), Hitmonchan (Monlee), Smoochum (Chumee), Arcanine (Archy), Parasect (Parasee), Mr. Mime, and Cubone (Bonee).  In HG/SS she is sixteen.

Hoenn
Ruby - The male protagonist in the Ruby & Sapphire and Omega Ruby & Alpha Sapphire chapters. The well-meaning but a bit obnoxious protagonist of the fourth chapter, and Gym Leader Norman’s son, as well as Sapphire's rival. He hates Pokémon battles and prefers to compete in Pokémon Contests, as a result of what had happened to him and Sapphire when they were young. He was able to win every Contest, gaining the title "Charmer". Ruby received the starter Pokémon Mudkip, which evolves into a Swampert. His party last checked consists of Swampert (Mumu), Mightyena (Nana), Delcatty (Kiki), Castform (Fofo), Milotic (Feefee) and Gardevoir (Rara). He previously had a Celebi.
Sapphire - The female protagonist in the Ruby & Sapphire and Omega Ruby & Alpha Sapphire chapters. Daughter of Professor Birch and Ruby’s rival. She is very wild and often dresses in clothes made of leaves. She loves battling and thinks Pokémon Coordinators (like Ruby) are prissy, as a result of what had happened to her and Ruby when they were young. She was able to defeat every Gym Leader, earning the title "Conqueror". She had Torchic for a starter Pokémon, which evolves into a Blaziken. Her party last checked consists of Blaziken (Chic), Aggron (Rono), Wailord (Lorry), Donphan (Phado), Tropius (Troppy) and Relicanth (Relly).
Emerald - The protagonist in the Emerald chapter and the other male protagonist in Omega Ruby & Alpha Sapphire chapter. He initially did not have any Pokémon, but later was joined by a Sudowoodo and Dusclops. He also carries a concealed gun known as an E-Shooter as a tool to calm Pokémon. Emerald was hired by Crystal to compete in the Battle Frontier to protect the legendary Pokémon Jirachi from an evil man named Guile Hideout. For his skill in calming down rampaging Pokémon, he gained the title of "Calmer". Emerald also stole a Sceptile from the Battle Factory, which was none other than the same Grovyle which was blown away from Sky Pillar while awakening Rayquaza. Emerald uses Pokémon that Crystal owns in each attraction, excluding the Battle Factory, Battle Tower, Battle Palace, and Battle Arena. He also apparently has a connection to the legendary Pokémon Latios and Latias. Emerald's party last checked consists of Sceptile, Dusclops, Sudowoodo, Snorlax, Mr. Mime and Mantine.

Sinnoh
Diamond (Dia) - The male protagonist in the Diamond & Pearl and Platinum chapters. An aspiring Pokémon Comedian with a gluttonous and rather dim-witted personality, though one who has been shown to sometimes exhibit charisma and insight in desperate situations ("Empathizer"). Is kind to everyone, quick to make friends, and has a very powerful moral code. He is a Pokémon trainer and a very good friend of Pearl. He has a Bastiodon (Don), Lickilicky (Kit), Munchlax (Lax), and Torterra (Tru). He also owns a Mamoswine (Moo) that was given to him by Platinum. He is also known for having the legendary Regigigas (Reg). Because of a mix-up, he initially thinks that if he escorts Berlitz to Mt. Coronet he will win a prize, but alongside Pearl he decides to accompany her anyway after the truth is revealed. During the journey, he develops a strong friendship with Platinum.
Pearl - The other male protagonist in the Diamond & Pearl and Platinum chapters. A headstrong boy with a hasty personality and dream of becoming a great comedian. Pearl is never afraid to speak his mind and has a strong sense of determination ("Determiner"). He is a Pokémon comedian (like his friend Diamond) and has a Chatot (Chatler), Luxray (Rayler), Infernape (Chimler),  Buizel (Zeller), Tauros (Tauler), and Diglett (Digler). Because of a mix-up, he initially thinks that if he escorts Berlitz to Mt. Coronet, he will win a prize. Though suspicious of her at first, Pearl grows to respect Platinum for her many talents.
Platinum Berlitz - The female protagonist in the Diamond & Pearl and Platinum chapters. The elegant but spoiled protagonist of a very wealthy and important family, she has to travel to Mt. Coronet as part of a ritual. She has read many books with rich knowledge and hope to be able to practice ("Understander"). She receives three Pokédexes, three Pokétches, and the three starters (Turtwig, Chimchar, and Piplup) from Professor Rowan to give to her partners. She owns an Empoleon, Rapidash, and Lopunny. She was also given a Froslass, Cherrim and Pachirisu by Candice, Gardenia and Maylene (Although the Pachirisu actually belonged to Volkner). Throughout the early portions of the story, her first name is omitted and not revealed; later, her name is revealed as Platinum. She is known to enter many competitions, such as Pokémon Super Contests, gym leaders battles, and Sinnoh Battle Frontier.

Unova
Black - The male protagonist in the Black & White chapter. He owns a male Tepig, and his quest is to be a master trainer. Black meets White in an accident with a Galvantula busting one of White's business. His Tepig has a crush on White's. He can be very perceptive but his dream of winning the Pokémon League fills his mind so much that he can't think properly ("Dreamer"). When this happens his Munna (Musha) eats his dreams so he can think clearly like a reasoner. Last checked his party consists of Braviary (Brav), Musharna (Musha), Emboar (Bo), Galvantula (Tula), Carracosta (Costa) and possibly Reshiram.
White - The female protagonist the in Black & White chapter. She is the owner of a Pokémon agency, which rents Pokémon to movies and ads ("Dreamer"). She owned a female Tepig (Gigi), but when it left her for N, she received N's Servine, who she tries to name Amanda. Amanda later evolves into Serperior, and White also obtains a Deerling (Darlene), Stunfisk (Dorothy), Alomomola (Nancy), Duosion (Solly), and Vullaby (Barbara). Gigi eventually decided to come back to her agency.
Blake (known as Lack-two in Japan) - The male protagonist in the Black 2 & White 2 chapter. He is a member of the International Police in search for Neo Team Plasma's members ("Arrester"). He is shown owning a Dewott, Keldeo (Keldemaru), Genesect, Kabutops (Kabutomaru) and Gliscor (Liomaru).
Whitley (known as Whi-two in Japan) - The female protagonist in the Black 2 & White 2 chapter. She is a former member of Team Plasma with her mother. She believes former Team Plasma is good, and N will return to lead them ("Liberator"). She is shown having a Foongus (Foongy), an Accelgor, N's Zorua and Tepig (Lady Gigi).

Kalos
X - The male protagonist in the X & Y chapter. A boy who won a Pokémon Tournament when he was younger but became overwhelmed by paparazzi and became a depressed shut-in ("Loner"). He owns a Kangaskhan (Kanga and Li'l Kanga), Charizard (Salamè), Manectric (Élec), Gengar (Garma), and Pinsir (Rute) that can all Mega Evolve. He also has a Chesnaught nicknamed Marisso. 
Y - The female protagonist in the X & Y chapter. A girl who dreams of becoming a Sky Trainer although her mother is a popular Rhyhorn racer ("Flyer"), and her full name known as Y na Gabena (Yvonne Gabena in English). She has an intrepid personality and is a leader in their friends. She is shown with a Fletchinder (Fletchy, originally a Fletchling),  Sylveon (Veevee), Greninja (Croaky), Rhyhorn (Rhyrhy), Absol (Solsol that can Mega Evolve), and Xerneas (Xerxer) although the last one was eventually lost as it turns back into its tree form.

Alola
Sun - The male protagonist in the Sun & Moon and Ultra Sun & Ultra Moon chapters. A money obsessed boy from Kanto with many jobs, mainly as a delivery boy. His goal is to collect 100 million Yen to buy back an island the Aether Foundation stole from his great-grandfather ("Saver"). He is currently shown to have an Alolan Meowth (Cent), an Incineroar (Dollar), a Totem Wishiwashi (Quarter), a Totem Mimikyu (Penny), a Crabominable (Dong) and a Stakataka (Lei).
Moon - The female protagonist in the Sun & Moon and Ultra Sun & Ultra Moon chapters. A girl from Sinnoh who is skilled at archery, but is also a pharmacist ("Mixer"). She came to Alola to find materials to cure a Piplup. She is currently shown with a Charjabug, Mareanie, Alolan Muk, and Decidueye.

Galar
Henry (known as Soudo/Sword in Japan) - The male protagonist in the Sword & Shield chapter. When working on gear, he hyperfocuses, but otherwise he seems laidback- if a tad manipulative. Feels responsible for Casey losing her Pokemon and is going through the League challenge to help her find them. Has a Thwackey (Twiggy), Sirfetch'd (Lancelot) and a Gurdurr (Steeler), named after their gear.
Casey (known as Shieldmilia in Japan) - The female protagonist in the Sword & Shield chapter. Full name known as Casey Shield , is a loud, energetic girl who is a technological prodigy. She has a very analytic mind and loves Dynamaxing and pranks. Has a Ball Guy head that may or may not be the real deal and a tragic past where she lost all five of her Pokemon. With the help of Henry, Professor Magnolia and Marvin, she hopes to win the Pokemon League to gain press attention and use it to search for her team. Her starter Pokemon is a Scorbunny (currently a Raboot), but as the chapter progresses, she recovers her lost party. She also known as Schilly in the English fan translation.

Development
Series writer Hidenori Kusaka was offered to make a Pokémon manga by Nintendo. Having been a fan of manga ever since he was a child, Kusaka quickly accepted. The serialization of the manga began in Shogakukan's 4th grade Elementary School magazine in March 1997, and since then, it has been serialized through other Shogakukan's magazines and platforms, including CoroCoro Ichiban!, Sunday Webry and Pokémon Fan. When writing the series, Kusaka always tries to add elements of amazements with the idea that the readers would feel they are actually playing a video game. Some parts from the story are based on Kusaka's thoughts of the Pokémon video games, which includes weapon designs and the areas where wild Pokémon live. His main focus in manga is to create Pokémon that looks attractive so that readers would appreciate them more. He also tries to balance the number of Pokémon trainers and Pokémon in order to be faithful to the game.

During publication of the series, artist Mato fell sick leaving Kusaka to either cancel the series or select another artist. He decided to continue and chose Satoshi Yamamoto as Mato's replacement. Yamamoto felt pressure during his debut as older fans criticized his art in comparison to Mato. When he started drawing he had little knowledge about Pokémon, but still he was focused in the drawing for the new protagonist, Crystal. After working for a year, he was surprised with Kusaka's stories and wanted to make his pictures give a good impression. During the fourth story arc, Yamamoto mentioned that several of the disasters happening in the Hoenn region that he drew are based on his favorite horror and monster movies.

Reception
Japanese volumes from the series have been featured in the Japanese comic ranking various times. Viz's first volumes edition from the manga, "The Best of Pokémon Adventures", appeared on ICv2's Top 20 Graphic Novels from April 2008. It also won the first Nickelodeon Magazine Comics Awards in the category "Favorite Manga Series". Readers from Media Factory's Da Vinci Denshi Navi magazine voted the series as the third manga they wanted to have an animated adaptation. As of September 2014, the manga had over 12 million copies in circulation only in Japan. As of August 2017, it had 28 million copies in circulation worldwide.

ICv2's Nick Smith gave the first volume 3.5 stars out of 5, commenting that several of the parts from the manga make it more interesting than the anime, such as Team Rocket's appearances or Pikachu's rebelled personality. Although he still noted there was more violence in the manga than in the anime, he still recommended it for all ages. A similar opinion was given by Active Anime's Scott Campbell who liked how different Red's character was from Ash Ketchum due to their differences in personality and abilities, making the former character seem more interesting for the readers. The artwork was described as "fairly cutesy and fun, but still of a very high quality" while fights received positive responses due to the Pokémon's movements.

Volume 14 charted at number 10 on The New York Times Manga Best Seller list on the week ending August 6, 2011.

Tsunekazu Ishihara, CEO of The Pokémon Company, said "I want every Pokémon fan to read this comic!"

Sales announcement mistake
Southeast Asia publisher Shogakukan Asia had announced that the manga had sold over 150 million copies worldwide. However, in December 2017, the illustrator Satoshi Yamamoto stated on his Twitter account that this was an error.

Notes

References

External links

Pocket Monsters Special Japanese website 
Official Pokémon Adventures website of Viz Media

1997 manga
Adventure anime and manga
Children's manga
Fantasy anime and manga
Pokémon manga
Shogakukan manga
Viz Media manga